Protect Democracy is a nonprofit organization based in the United States. A nonpartisan group, Protect Democracy seeks to check authoritarian attacks on U.S. democracy.

The group states that it seeks to counter the politicization of independent institutions, the spreading of disinformation, the corruption of elections, and other anti-democratic tactics. The group has released "The Authoritarian Playbook," a media guide for how to distinguish authoritarianism from other forms of politics. It has also issued reports and policy proposals examining the links between anti-democratic extremism and the U.S. electoral system.

According to Time Magazine, Protect Democracy is a “defender of America’s system of government against the threat of authoritarianism.”

Leadership 
In 2016, Protect Democracy was co-founded by Ian Bassin, Justin Florence, and Emily Loeb, who served as lawyers in the White House Counsel’s Office under former President Barack Obama. The co-founders worked with Harvard University political scientists Steven Levitsky and Daniel Ziblatt, who joined the group’s Board of Advisors.

Bassin, a former White House associate counsel, serves as the executive director of Protect Democracy.

Activities 
Protect Democracy advocates for maintaining a strong separation between the White House and the Justice Department. In 2020, the group collected letters from hundreds of DOJ alumni, calling for former Attorney General William Barr to step down. The DOJ alumni also claimed the Mueller report presented enough evidence to charge former President Donald Trump with obstruction of justice.

Protect Democracy has criticized both Democrats and Republicans over resisting congressional oversight. In 2021, the group represented 66 former members of Congress, including two dozen Republicans, challenging Trump’s efforts to block the January 6th Select Committee from accessing his presidential records. During the 2020 election, Bassin urged then-candidate Joe Biden to reverse course after declaring he would defy a subpoena if called to testify in Trump’s first impeachment. Biden eventually backed off his comments.

Following the January 6th Capitol riots, Protect Democracy represented Capitol Police officers suing Trump under the Klan Act for his role in inciting the crowd. In February 2022, the Court denied Trump’s motion to dismiss the case. In an amicus brief filed in the case, the DOJ rejected Trump’s claim to have blanket immunity from civil liability for his conduct in office. Protect Democracy also represented Lt. Col. Alexander Vindman in a case against former Trump aides and allies, accusing them of intimidating and retaliating against him for testifying against Trump during his first impeachment.

In 2019, Protect Democracy convened the nonpartisan "National Task Force on Election Crises," a cross-ideological group of more than 50 experts on elections, security, public health, and other areas. The Task Force issued analyses and reports, holding press briefings on how the electoral system is supposed to work for the purpose of building resiliency against efforts to subvert the electoral process.

In 2021, along with the States United Democracy Center and Law Forward, Protect Democracy issued an initial report on state legislative attempts that threaten to subvert elections. It has subsequently released updates to the report. Collaborating with the University of Chicago's Center for Effective Government, Protect Democracy experts have hosted two “Rethinking Our Democracy” series in The Washington Post, proposing institutional reforms to strengthen American democracy.

Protect Democracy developed the software VoteShield, which uses publicly available data to track changes to voter rolls, identifying potentially suspicious irregularities. The group also launched "Law for Truth," which uses defamation law to impose accountability on those who spread election disinformation. Law for Truth has brought lawsuits on behalf of election workers in Georgia and a postmaster in Pennsylvania, who suffered online and offline threats to their safety due to false media stories about their alleged involvement in election fraud.

Protect Democracy has challenged Republican and Democratic officials over claims that they were misusing their offices to improperly interfere in elections. In 2018, Protect Democracy sued then-Georgia Secretary of State Brian Kemp, seeking his recusal from overseeing a recount in an election in which he was also a candidate. The group also filed a lawsuit against then-Florida Governor Rick Scott, claiming the Constitution sets limits on an elected official’s ability to exercise governmental powers over their own election. Protect Democracy later challenged Mississippi Attorney General Jim Hood, a Democrat, for appearing to use his governmental position to advance his own candidacy for governor.

References 

Political advocacy groups
Non-profit organizations based in the United States
Organizations established in 2016
2016 establishments in the United States